Portsmouth Council may be:

 Portsmouth City Council, Hampshire, England
 City of Portsmouth city council, New Hampshire, United States
 Boy Scout councils
 Portsmouth Council, Ohio (historical)
 Portsmouth Council, Virginia (historical)
 Portsmouth Council, New Hampshire (historical)
 Portsmouth Area Council, Virginia (historical)